Kasane International Airport  is an airport serving Kasane, a town in the Chobe District of Botswana.

Air Botswana provides scheduled service between Kasane and Gaborone on Tuesdays, Fridays, and Sundays.  Numerous charter flight operators offer flights to other destinations in the vicinity.

Because it is near Chobe National Park, the airport is mainly used for tourism. Most lodges in the Kasane area provide shuttles from and to the airport. A bus shuttle is available for travel to Victoria Falls in Zambia and Zimbabwe.

History
The present  terminal was opened on 22 February 2018. It replaced the original  terminal building which opened in 1991.

The Kasane VOR and ADF are situated at the airport.

Airlines and destinations

Charter operators
 Wilderness Air – Windhoek to Kasane
 Moremi Air Services

See also

Transport in Botswana
List of airports in Botswana

References

External links
OurAirports - Kasane
SkyVector - Kasane
Kasane Airport information

Airports in Botswana
Kasane